A milkman is a person who delivers milk in bottles or cartons to houses.

Milkman may also refer to:
 Cowman (profession), a person responsible for milking
 Slang for a man who lactates: see Male lactation
 Milkman (novel), a 2018 novel by Anna Burns
 The Milkman, a 1950 American, black and white film
 Milkman (Phranc album), 1998
 Milk Man (Deerhoof album), 2004
 "Milkman", a song by Aphex Twin from Girl/Boy EP

See also
 Alaska Milkmen, an old name for the basketball team Alaska Aces
 Lechero, a character in the American television series Prison Break